Mohamed Ali Fatnassi is a paralympic athlete from Tunisia competing mainly in category F20 shot put events.

Mohamed's only appearance at the Paralympics was in 2000 Summer Paralympics where he won a silver medal in the F20 shot put.

References

Paralympic athletes of Tunisia
Athletes (track and field) at the 2000 Summer Paralympics
Paralympic silver medalists for Tunisia
Living people
Medalists at the 2000 Summer Paralympics
Tunisian male shot putters
Year of birth missing (living people)
Paralympic medalists in athletics (track and field)
20th-century Tunisian people
21st-century Tunisian people